Greg Jensen is a former center in the National Football League.

Biography
Jensen was born on January 23, 1962 (55 years old) in Sauk City, Wisconsin. He attended Sauk Prairie High School in Prairie du Sac, Wisconsin.

Career
Jensen was a member of the Green Bay Packers during the 1987 NFL season.

See also
List of Green Bay Packers players

References

People from Sauk City, Wisconsin
Players of American football from Wisconsin
Green Bay Packers players
American football centers
Living people
1962 births